Abdulai Iddrisu (born 14 May 1997) is a Ghanaian professional footballer who plays as goalkeeper for Tanzanian Premier League side Azam F.C.

Early life 
Iddrisu was born on 14 May 1997 in Sawla in the Sawla-Tuna-Kalba District of the Savannah Region. He started playing football as a goalkeeper at the age 13 in primary school after his sports master discovered his talent and football skills. Throughout his basic school level, he manned the post for every school he attended, participating in Inter-School and District Sports Competitions.

Career 
Iddrisu joined Bechem United in October 2020, ahead of the 2020–21 season. He made his debut on 7 February 2020, in their 3–1 home victory over Accra Great Olympics. He was given his first start of the season after playing second fiddle for majority of the season to either Prince Asempah or Daniel Afadzwu.He later became the first choice goalkeeper in that season. In the 2021/2022 season, Abdulai Iddrisu kept 18 clean sheets in 31 games, he also became the first goalkeeper to keep 7 consecutive clean sheets in a season.  He was awarded the best goalkeeper award in Ghana ahead of Ibrahim Danlad of kotoko and Jojo Walcott of chalton athletics.

References

External links 

 

1977 births
Living people
Ghanaian Muslims
Association football goalkeepers
Ghanaian footballers